Headley is a village and civil parish in the East Hampshire district of Hampshire, England. It is 1.8 miles (2.9 km) east of Bordon on the B3002 road.

The nearest railway station is 3.6 miles (5.8 km) south of the village at Liphook.

The civil parish of Headley has a population of over 5,500. The parish comprises a number of settlements as well as the village of Headley itself: Standford, Arford, Headley Down, Barford, Wishanger, Sleaford, Trottsford, and part of Hollywater. The original parish included Grayshott (until 1902), Lindford, and a considerable portion of Bordon (until 1929). The ecclesiastical parish of All Saints, Headley served Lindford and Bordon, although not Grayshott, until March 2002 — since then Bordon has become a separate ecclesiastical parish.

History
Headley is the oldest of three villages in the south of England of that name and has gone through a number of name spellings, but was first noted (no households were recorded) in the Domesday Book of 1086, at which time Eustace II, Count of Boulogne was tenant-in-chief and Lord. In 1066, Earl Godwin held it. In the 1908 History of the County of Hampshire, Headley is described in detail.

Amenities
All Saints Anglican Church is in the centre of the village, and is in the Diocese of Guildford. The church predates 1836 when the wooden-shingled spire burnt down. The church was subsequently rebuilt (without the spire) in 1859. Features in the rebuilt church date its existence back at least to the 13th century. Nikolaus Pevsner noted that the oblong piece of 13th century stained glass of a female saint being decapitated was ”exquisite”.

Headley Cricket Club is to the west of the village centre, their grounds also accommodating bowls and soccer clubs. Headley CC play in the I'Anson league (2015) and have 3 senior teams, as well as youth teams.

The Holly Bush is a public house in the centre of the village. It dates from the 19th century. Its predecessor of the same name is believed to have been on the other side of the road when William Cobbett (Rural Rides) visited Headley in 1822.

Headley Theatre Club was founded in 1952, building on the success of a pageant held to celebrate the Festival of Britain the previous year. It was felt that an organisation should be formed in the Village to encourage such enthusiasm and talent on a more permanent basis. The Club puts on a pantomime, a 3-act play and a musical event each year.

Notable inhabitants
 Lord King-Hall of Headley - journalist, playwright and politician.
 Sir Robert Samuel Wright - British judge and author.

Properties
 Headley Grange was used as a recording studio by several famous pop groups in the 1970s including: Genesis, Bad Company, Pretty Things, Ian Dury (1976) and Clover (1977) – notably in 1971 Led Zeppelin recorded their fourth album there, Led Zeppelin IV, containing Stairway to Heaven.
 Benifold, in Headley Hill Road, was bought by the group Fleetwood Mac in 1970 and used to record their Penguin and Mystery to Me albums with the Rolling Stones Mobile Studio, having recorded Future Games at Advision Studios in London and Bare Trees at De Lane Lea Studios in the London district of Wembley. They sold the property around 1974 after permanently relocating to Los Angeles, California.

References

External links

Headley Village web site

British History Online: Headley
Historical information on GENUKI
Headley history
Headley Village Hall
Headley Society
Canadians in Headley during WW2
 Historical links and publications about Headley

Villages in Hampshire
Civil parishes in Hampshire
East Hampshire District